Ferenc Puskás (born Ferenc Purczeld; 1 April 1927 – 17 November 2006) was a Hungarian football player and manager, widely regarded as one of the greatest players of all time and the sport's first international superstar. A forward, he scored 84 goals in 85 international matches for Hungary and played four international matches for Spain. He became an Olympic champion in 1952 and led his nation to the final of the 1954 World Cup. He won three European Cups (1959, 1960, 1966), ten national championships (five Hungarian and five Spanish Primera División) and eight top individual scoring honors. Known as the "Galloping Major", in 1995, he was recognized as the greatest top division scorer of the 20th century by the IFFHS. With 806 goals in 793 official games scored during his career, he is the seventh top goalscorer of all time.

He was the son of former footballer Ferenc Puskás Senior. Puskás started his career in Hungary playing for Kispest and Budapest Honvéd. He was the top scorer in the Hungarian League on four occasions and in 1948 he was the top goal scorer in Europe. During the 1950s, he was both a prominent member and captain of the Hungarian national team, known as the Mighty Magyars. In 1958, two years after the Hungarian Revolution, he emigrated to Spain where he played for Real Madrid. While playing with Real Madrid, Puskás won four Pichichis and scored seven goals in two European Champions Cup finals. He scored 619 goals in 618 matches in the Hungarian and Spanish leagues and National Cups.

After retiring as a player, he became a coach. The highlight of his coaching career came in 1971 when he guided Panathinaikos to the European Cup final, where they lost 2–0 to AFC Ajax. In 1993, he returned to Hungary and took temporary charge of the Hungarian national team. In 1998, he became one of the first ever FIFA/SOS Charity ambassadors. In 2002, the Népstadion in Budapest was renamed the Puskás Ferenc Stadion in his honor. He was also declared the best Hungarian player of the last 50 years by the Hungarian Football Federation in the UEFA Jubilee Awards in November 2003. In October 2009, FIFA announced the introduction of the FIFA Puskás Award, awarded to the player who has scored the "most beautiful goal" over the past year. He was also listed in Pelé's FIFA 100.

Career in Hungary

Early years

Ferenc Purczeld was born on 1 April 1927 to a German (Danube Swabian) family in Budapest and brought up in Kispest, then a suburb, today part of the city. His mother, Margit Biró (1904–1976), was a seamstress. He began his career as a junior with Kispest AC, where his father, who had previously played for the club, was a coach.

In 1937, his father changed the family name to Puskás. He initially used the pseudonym "Miklós Kovács" to help circumvent the minimum age rules before officially signing at the age of 12. Among his early teammates was his childhood friend and future international teammate József Bozsik. He made his first senior appearance for Kispest in November 1943 in a match against Nagyváradi AC. It was here where he received the nickname "Öcsi" or "Buddy".

Kispest was taken over by the Hungarian Ministry of Defence in 1949, becoming the Hungarian Army team and changing its name to Budapest Honvéd. As a result, football players were given military ranks. Puskás eventually became a major (Hungarian: Őrnagy), which led to the nickname "The Galloping Major". As the army club, Honvéd used conscription to acquire the best Hungarian players leading to the recruitment of Zoltán Czibor and Sándor Kocsis. During his career at Budapest Honvéd, Puskás helped the club win five Hungarian League titles. He also finished as top goal scorer in the league in 1947–48, 1949–50, 1950 and 1953, scoring 50, 31, 25 and 27 goals, respectively. In 1948, he was the top goal scorer in Europe.

Mighty Magyars

Puskás made his debut for Hungary team on 20 August 1945 and scored in a 5–2 win over Austria. He went on to play 85 games and scored 84 times for Hungary. His international goal record included two hat tricks against Austria, one against Luxembourg and four goals in a 12–0 win over Albania. Together with Zoltán Czibor, Sándor Kocsis, József Bozsik, and Nándor Hidegkuti, he formed the nucleus of the Golden Team that was to remain unbeaten for 32 consecutive games. During this run, they became Olympic Champions in 1952, beating Yugoslavia 2–0 in the final in Helsinki. Puskás scored four times at the Olympic tournament, including the opening goal in the final. They also defeated England twice, first with a 6–3 win at Wembley Stadium., and then 7–1 in Budapest. Puskás scored two goals in each game against England. In 1953, they also won the 1948-53 Central European International Cup. Hungary won the championship after finishing top of the table with 11 points. Puskás finished the tournament as top scorer with ten goals and scored twice as Hungary claimed the trophy with a 3–0 win over Italy at the Stadio Olimpico in 1953.

Puskás scored three goals in the two first-round matches Hungary played at the 1954 FIFA World Cup. They defeated South Korea 9–0 and then West Germany 8–3. In the latter game, he suffered a hairline fracture of the ankle after a tackle by Werner Liebrich, and did not return until the final.

Puskás played the entire 1954 World Cup final against West Germany with a hairline fracture. Despite this, he scored his fourth goal of the tournament to put Hungary ahead after six minutes, and with Czibor adding another goal two minutes later, it seemed that the pre-tournament favorites would take the title. However, the West Germans pulled back two goals before half time, with six minutes left the West Germans scored the winner. Two minutes from the end of the match Puskás scored a late equalizer but the goal was disallowed due to an offside call.
Ending the Golden years with a silver medal at the 1955-60 Central European International Cup, making it a grand total of two gold/titles and two silver for the Mighty Magyars.

Ferenc Puskás' statistics at the 1952 Helsinki Olympics
The scores contain links to the article on football in the Helsinki Olympics and the round in question.

Ferenc Puskás' statistics at the 1954 World Cup in Switzerland
The scores contain links to the article on 1954 FIFA World Cup and the round in question. When there is a special article on the match in question, the link is in the column for round.

Honvéd World Tour

Budapest Honvéd entered the European Cup in 1956 and were drawn against Athletic Bilbao in the first round. Honvéd lost the away leg 2–3, but before the home leg could be played, the Hungarian Revolution erupted in Budapest and was subsequently brutally repressed by Soviet forces. The players decided against going back to communist Hungary and arranged for the return with Athletic to be played at Heysel Stadium in Brussels, Belgium. Puskás scored in the subsequent 3–3 draw but Honvéd were eliminated 6–5 on aggregate, and the Hungarian players were left in limbo. They summoned their families from Budapest, and despite opposition from FIFA and the Hungarian football authorities, they organised a fundraising tour of Italy, Portugal, Spain, and Brazil. After returning to Europe, the players parted ways. Some, including Bozsik, returned to Hungary while others, including Czibor, Kocsis and Puskás, found new clubs in Western Europe. Puskás did not return to Hungary until 1981.

Spanish career
In Spain he is known also under the nickname of Pancho.

Real Madrid

After refusing to return to Hungary, Puskás initially played a few unofficial games for RCD Espanyol. At the same time, both AC Milan and Juventus attempted to sign him, but then he received a two-year ban from UEFA for refusing to return to Budapest, which prevented him from playing in Europe. He moved to Austria and then Italy. After his ban expired, Puskás tried to play in Italy but was not able to find a top-flight club willing to sign him, as Italian managers were concerned about his age and weight. He was considered by Manchester United to strengthen a squad ravaged by the Munich Air Disaster in 1958, but because of FA rules regarding foreigners and Puskás' not knowing the English language, stand-in manager Jimmy Murphy could not fulfill his wish of signing the Hungarian. However, a few months later, Puskás joined Real Madrid and at the age of 31 embarked on the second phase of his career.

During his first La Liga season, Puskás scored four hat-tricks, including one in his second game, against Sporting de Gijón on 21 September 1958. In the game against UD Las Palmas on 4 January 1959, Puskás and Alfredo di Stéfano scored hat-tricks in a 10–1 win. During the 1960–61 season, Puskás scored four times in a game against Elche CF and the following season, he scored five goals against the same team. Puskás scored two hat-tricks against FC Barcelona in 1963, one at the Bernabéu and one at the Camp Nou. During eight seasons with Real, Puskás played 180 La Liga games and scored 156 goals. He scored 20 or more goals in each of his first six seasons in the Spanish league, and won the Pichichi four times: in 1960, 1961, 1963, and 1964, scoring 25, 28, 26 and 21 goals, respectively. He helped Real win La Liga five times in a row between 1961 and 1965 and the Copa del Generalísimo in 1962. He scored both goals in the 2–1 victory over Sevilla FC in the Copa final.

Puskás also played a further 39 games for Real in the European Cup, scoring 35 goals. He helped Real reach the final of the 1958–59 European Cup, scoring in the first leg and in the decisive replay of the semi-final against Atlético Madrid, but missed the final due to injury. In the following season he began Real's 1959–60 European Cup campaign with a hat-trick against Jeunesse Esch and in the semi-final against FC Barcelona, as Puskás once again guided Real into the final with three goals over two legs. In the final itself, Real beat Eintracht Frankfurt 7–3 with Puskás scoring four goals and di Stéfano scoring three. In subsequent European campaigns, he would score a further three hat-tricks, including one in the 1962 final against Benfica, which Real lost 5–3. In 1965, he scored five goals over two games against Feyenoord as he helped Real Madrid to the 1966 European Cup final – Real won the game against Partizan Belgrade, but Puskás did not play.

Spanish national appearances
In 1962, Puskás became a naturalized a Spanish citizen, and subsequently played four times for Spain. Three of these games were at the 1962 World Cup. In Spain, he was known as Cañoncito Pum (the booming cannon).

Appearance for Madrid autonomous team
On 28 October 1963, Puskás appeared in a game for the Madrid football team at the FFM Trofeo Bodas de Oro, and he scored two late goals in a 4–0 win over Andalusia.

Appearance for South Liverpool
In 1967, at the age of 40, he appeared in a fundraising friendly game for South Liverpool, the English non-League side, in front of a 10,000-strong sell-out crowd at the club's Holly Park stadium.

Managerial career

After retiring as a player, Puskás became a coach and managed teams in Europe, North America, South America, Africa, Asia, and Australia.

In 1971, he guided Panathinaikos of Greece to the European Cup final, the only time a Greek club has reached a European final to date. In the qualifying rounds they beat Everton in the quarter-finals on away goals, then defeated Red Star Belgrade in the semis. In the final Panathinaikos lost 2–0 to Johan Cruyff's Ajax. During his four-year tenure at Panathinaikos, Puskás helped the team secure one Greek Championship in 1972. However, with the notable exception of his spell at Panathinaikos, Puskás failed to transfer his success as a player to his coaching career. Despite his wide travels, his only other success came with South Melbourne Hellas, with whom he won the National Soccer League title in 1991, as well as an NSL Cup in 1990 and two Dockerty Cup titles in 1989 and 1991. While managing the Australian club, one of his players was future Australia and Celtic manager Ange Postecoglou, who has spoken of the influence Puskas' all out attacking approach had on his coaching style.

When Wolverhampton Wanderers opened their renovated stadium Molineux in 1993, Puskás visited the newly opened stadium as an honorary guest to watch the friendly match between Wolves and Budapest Honvéd, which was a match to christen the new opening of the stadium. This was because in the 1950s, Wolves played a game against Honvéd in a memorable friendly match, which Puskás played in. Wolves won the 1954 match 3–2, with the 1993 match ending in a 1–1 draw.

Puskás returned to Hungary for the first time in 1981 and in 1990, he made Budapest his home again. In 1993, he took charge of the Hungary national team for four games, including a 4–2 friendly victory against the Republic of Ireland in Dublin, where Hungary came from two goals down to eventually beat their opponents.

Style of play

Puskas had excellent ball control, mostly with his left foot, and had a great first touch of the ball giving very quick and precise passing and crossing. He also was able to maneuver and change positions quickly on the pitch by moving from inside left to centre forward. He was also able to dummy his opponents with fake dribbles and would confuse his markers by pretending to go one way before going another. He did this to Bill Eckersley and Harry Johnston when Hungary beat England 6–3 at Wembley. Puskas also used to move the ball in different directions and sideways to go past his opponents with ease. Puskas was also excellent at the set pieces, often scoring a powerful direct free-kicks. He also scored directly from a corner kick. Puskas had one of the most powerful left shots in history and often scored from 30 to 35 metres from goal.

Later life and death

Puskás was diagnosed with Alzheimer's disease in 2000. He was admitted to a Budapest hospital in September 2006 and died on 17 November 2006 of pneumonia. He was 79 years old and was survived by his wife of 57 years, Erzsébet, and their daughter, Anikó. In a state funeral, his coffin was moved from Puskás Ferenc Stadion to Heroes' Square for a military salute. He was buried under the dome of the St Stephen's Basilica in Budapest on 9 December 2006.

Legacy

 The Népstadion in Budapest was renamed the Puskás Ferenc Stadion in 2002.
 Asteroid 82656 Puskás, discovered by Krisztián Sárneczky and Gyula M. Szabó in 2001, was named in his honor. The official  was published by the Minor Planet Center on 9 August 2006.
 A street named Újtemető utca near Stadium Bozsik in the Hungarian capital of Budapest (specifically the district of Kispest) was renamed after Puskás precisely one year after the footballer's death.
 The new Puskás Aréna, its metro station, Puskás Akadémia FC, Puskás Cup, and the FIFA Puskás Award all bear his name.
 A statue of Puskás was unveiled in 2017 in Melbourne, Australia, near the former site of the now demolished Olympic Park Stadium, where he led South Melbourne Hellas to the 1991 NSL Championship as manager.

Film

 He appears in Wonder Striker (A csodacsatár). Director: Márton Keleti.
 He appears in one scene in the Egyptian movie Ghareeb fi Bayti while he was watching the football match in the stands. At the time of the film, he was a coach for the Egyptian club Al Masry.
 In one scene, he appears with Flórián Albert in The Enchanted Dollar. Director: István Bujtor
 Tamás Almási (director), Ádám Neményi (producer): Puskás Hungary, documentary, 2009.
 Csaba Gellár (director), Tamás Lajos, Sándor Takó (producer): The world of Little Puskás, animation series, 2021.

Career statistics

Club
Source:

International

Appearances and goals by national team and year

Managerial statistics

Honours

Player
Budapest Honvéd
 Nemzeti Bajnokság I: 1949–50, 1950, 1952, 1954, 1955

Real Madrid
 La Liga: 1960–61, 1961–62, 1962–63, 1963–64, 1964–65
 Copa del Generalísimo: 1961–62
 European Cup: 1958–59, 1959–60, 1965–66
 Intercontinental Cup: 1960

Hungary
 Summer Olympics: 1952
 Central European International Cup: 1948–53; runner-up: 1955–60
 Balkan Cup: 1947
 FIFA World Cup runner-up: 1954

Individual
 Ballon d'Or Silver Award: 1960
 Hungarian Football Federation Player of the Year: 1950
 Central European International Cup top scorer: 1948-53
 Hungarian top scorer: 1947–48, 1949–50, 1950, 1953
 Spanish League top scorer (Pichichi Trophy): 1959–60, 1960–61, 1962–63, 1963–64
 European Cup top scorer : 1959–60, 1963–64
 Golden Boot of the World: 1948
 World Soccer World XI: 1960, 1961, 1962, 1963
 1954 FIFA World Cup: Golden Ball
 1954 FIFA World Cup: All-Star Team
 European Player of the 20th century – L'Equipe
 Hungarian Player of the 20th century – IFFHS
 Football's Top Scorer of the 20th century – IFFHS
 Member of the FIFA 100
UEFA Golden Player: Greatest Hungarian Footballer of the last 50 Years
 Inaugural Inductee into Goal Hall of Fame 2014
 Top 10 Greatest Players of the 20th century (#7) – World Soccer Magazine
 Top 10 World's Best Players of the 20th century (#6) – IFFHS
 Top 10 Europe's Best Players of the 20th century (#4) – IFFHS
 Golden Foot: 2006 (as a legend)
 IFFHS Legends
 IFFHS Men Team of the Century (1901–2000)

Manager
Panathinaikos
 Super League Greece: 1969–70, 1971–72
 European Cup runner-up: 1970–71

Sol de América
 Paraguayan Primera División: 1986

South Melbourne Hellas
 National Soccer League: 1990–91
 NSL Cup: 1989–90
 Dockerty Cup: 1989, 1991

See also 

 List of top international association football goal scorers by country
 List of men's footballers with 50 or more international goals
 List of Spain international footballers born outside Spain
 List of Soviet and Eastern Bloc defectors
 List of footballers with 500 or more goals
 List of association football families
 FIFA Puskás Award
 Golden Team
 Puskás Cup

Notes

References
 

 (Autobiography) Ferenc Puskas: Captain of Hungary: Ferenc Puskas (1955). Reprinted in 2007 
 Behind the Curtain — Travels in Eastern European Football: Jonathan Wilson (2006) 
 The World Cup — The Complete History: Terry Crouch (2002) 
 50 Years of the European Cup and Champions League: Keir Radnedge (2005) 
 Obituary in The Guardian by Brian Glanville, 18 November 2006

External links

 Ferenc Puskás (career statistics) 
 
 
 National team data at BDFutbol
 
 Biography at Real Madrid Fans 
 Real Madrid profile
 Goals in European Cups at RSSSF
 Goals in International Matches at RSSSF
 
 
 
 Poetry dedicated to Puskas  

1927 births
2006 deaths
Footballers from Budapest
Hungarian footballers
Hungary international footballers
Hungarian football managers
Danube-Swabian people
Spanish footballers
Spain international footballers
Spanish football managers
Hungarian people of German descent
Hungarian-German people
Naturalised citizens of Spain
Spanish people of Hungarian descent
Spanish people of German descent
Association football forwards
Budapest Honvéd FC players
La Liga players
Real Madrid CF players
Dual internationalists (football)
1954 FIFA World Cup players
1962 FIFA World Cup players
Footballers at the 1952 Summer Olympics
Olympic footballers of Hungary
Olympic gold medalists for Hungary
Pichichi Trophy winners
FIFA 100
UEFA Golden Players
Hungarian expatriate football managers
Hungarian Roman Catholics
La Liga managers
Deportivo Alavés managers
Real Murcia managers
United Soccer Association coaches
North American Soccer League (1968–1984) coaches
Super League Greece managers
Panathinaikos F.C. managers
AEK Athens F.C. managers
Colo-Colo managers
South Melbourne FC managers
Hungary national football team managers
Hungarian expatriate footballers
Hungarian expatriate sportspeople in Spain
Hungarian expatriate sportspeople in the United States
Hungarian expatriate sportspeople in Canada
Hungarian expatriate sportspeople in Greece
Hungarian expatriate sportspeople in Chile
Hungarian expatriate sportspeople in Egypt
Hungarian expatriate sportspeople in Australia
Expatriate soccer managers in Australia
Expatriate soccer managers in Canada
Expatriate football managers in Chile
Expatriate football managers in Greece
Expatriate football managers in Paraguay
Expatriate football managers in Saudi Arabia
Expatriate soccer managers in the United States
Hungarian defectors
Deaths from Alzheimer's disease
Deaths from pneumonia in Hungary
Deaths from dementia in Hungary
Olympic medalists in football
Saudi Arabia national football team managers
Cerro Porteño managers
Al Masry SC managers
Vancouver Royals managers
Club Sol de América managers
Medalists at the 1952 Summer Olympics
UEFA Champions League winning players
UEFA Champions League top scorers
Nemzeti Bajnokság I players
Hungarian expatriate sportspeople in Saudi Arabia
Expatriate football managers in Egypt